{{Infobox football club
|clubname      = CSO Filiași
|image         = CSO_Filiași_logo.png
|image_size    = 180px
|caption       = 
|fullname      = Clubul Sportiv Orășenesc Filiași
|nickname      = Filieșenii(The People from Filiași)
 Alb-Albaștrii(The White-Blues) 
|short name    = Filiași
|founded       = 
|dissolved     = 
|ground        = Orășenesc
|capacity      = 1,360
|owner         = Filiași Town
|chairman      = Alin Pîrvuică
|manager       = Victor Naicu
|league        = Liga III
|season        = 2021–22
|position      = Liga III, Seria VI, 5th
|website       = https://www.csofiliasi.ro/
|kit_alt1      = 
|pattern_la1   = 
|pattern_b1    = _filiasi2021h
|pattern_ra1   = 
|pattern_sh1   = 
|pattern_so1   = 
|leftarm1      = FFFFFF
|body1         = 
|rightarm1     = FFFFFF
|shorts1       = 6098d7
|socks1        = FFFFFF
|kit_alt2      = 
|pattern_la2   = 
|pattern_b2    = _rasnov1920a
|pattern_ra2   = 
|pattern_sh2   = 
|pattern_so2   = 
|leftarm2      = ea1320
|body2         = 
|rightarm2     = ea1320
|shorts2       = 000000
|socks2        = 000000
}}

Clubul Sportiv Orășenesc Filiași, commonly known as CSO Filiași, or simply as Filiași, is a Romanian football club based in Filiași, Dolj County, currently playing in the Liga III.

Founded in 2008, CSO Filiași played at the amateur level until 2014, when it promoted to Liga III after winning a promotion play-off match against Flacăra Horezu, Vâlcea County champion. In the third tier, Filieșenii have consecrated themselves as a middle-table team, best rank being a 5th place obtained at the end of the 2018–19 season.

History
CSO Filiași was founded in 2008 and played at amateur level (Liga IV) until 2014, when it promoted to Liga III after winning Dolj County series and also the promotion play-off match against Flacăra Horezu, Vâlcea County champion. In the third tier, Filieșenii'' have consecrated themselves as a middle-table team, obtaining following results: 7th out of 13 (2014–15), 14th out of 15 (2015–16), 10th out of 15 (2016–17), 7th out of 15 (2017–18) and 5th out of 16 (2018–19).

During these years, the white and blue team had important managers, among them, Florin Șoavă, Silviu Lung or Mugur Gușatu.

Grounds

CSO Filiași plays its home matches on Orășenesc Stadium in Filiași, with a capacity of 1,360 seats. During the construction of the new stadium, CSO played on Oltenia Stadium in Ișalnița, with a capacity of 2,000 seats.

Honours
Liga III
Runners-up (1): 2020–21

Liga IV – Dolj County
Winners (1): 2013–14

Players

First team squad

Out on loan

Club Officials

Board of directors

Current technical staff

League history

Notable former managers
  Florin Șoavă
  Silviu Lung
  Mugur Gușatu

References

External links
 
 

Football clubs in Dolj County
Association football clubs established in 2008
Liga III clubs
Liga IV clubs
2008 establishments in Romania